Francis Arthur Cartledge (born 1899; date of death unknown) was an English footballer who played at centre-forward for Port Vale and Congleton Town in the 1920s.

Career
Cartledge played for Ravensdale Mission, before joining Port Vale as an amateur in November 1920. He signed as a professional in January 1921 and was a regular in the first team for the remainder of the season, playing 14 Second Division games and scoring one goal in a 2–1 win over Cardiff City. He lost his first team spot in August 1921. He helped the club to lift the North Staffordshire Infirmary Cup in 1922, but only played four league games and was released at the end of the season. He left The Old Recreation Ground and moved on to non-league Congleton Town.

Career statistics
Source:

References

Sportspeople from Burslem
English footballers
Association football forwards
Port Vale F.C. players
Congleton Town F.C. players
English Football League players
1899 births
Year of death missing